Alexander (Sandor) Stephen Gallus (born 5 June 1940 in Sopron, Hungary) is a medical researcher in haemostasis and thrombosis, the son of archaeologist Sandor Gallus, and the husband of former Australian politician Chris Gallus. He is Emeritus Professor, Flinders University, former Professor of Haematology, Flinders University School of Medicine and former Director of Pathology Services at Flinders Medical Centre and the Repatriation General Hospital, Adelaide, Australia.

Selected published works

References 

1940 births
Living people
Australian medical researchers
Hungarian emigrants to Australia
People from Sopron
Academic staff of Flinders University